Kolumbo is an active submarine volcano in the Aegean Sea in Greece, about 8 km northeast of Cape Kolumbo, Santorini island. The largest of a line of about twenty submarine volcanic cones extending to the northeast from Santorini, it is about 3 km in diameter with a crater 1.5 km across. It was "discovered" when it breached the sea surface in 1649-50, but its explosion was not to be compared to the well-known Thera explosion and caldera collapse, currently dated ca. 1630 BCE, with its devastating consequences for Minoan civilization. The Smithsonian Institution's Global Volcanism Program treats it as part of the Santorini volcano, though at least one source maintains that it is a separate magmatic system.
 
The 1650 explosion, which occurred when the accumulating cone reached the surface, sent pyroclastic flows across the sea surface to the shores and slopes of Santorini, where about seventy people and many animals died. A small ring of white pumice that formed was rapidly eroded away by wave action. The volcano collapsed into its caldera, triggering a tsunami that caused damage on nearby islands up to 150 km distant. The highest parts of the crater rim are now about 10 m below sea level.

In 2006, sea floor pyroclastic deposits from the two Aegean explosions were explored, sampled and mapped by an expedition by NOAA Ocean Explorer, equipped with ROV robotics.

The crater floor, averaging about 505 m below the sea surface, is marked in its northeast area by a field of hydrothermal vents and covered by a thick bacterial community, the 2006 NOAA expedition discovered. Superheated (measured as hot as 224 °C) metal-enriched water issuing from the vents has built chimneys of polymetallic sulfide/sulfates to a maximum height of 4 m, apparently accumulated since the 1650 event.

The 2006 expedition initiated new seismic air-gun techniques in order to determine the volume and distribution of the submarine volcanic deposit of pumice and ash on the sea floor around Santorini, which has been studied extensively since 1975. Revised, more accurate estimates of the total dense rock equivalent volume of the Minoan event(s), consisting of pyroclastic sea floor deposits, distal ash fallout and ignimbrites on the island of Santorini, is likely about 60 km³, a greatly increased estimate, comparable to the largest historic explosion, Mount Tambora 1815; the increased estimate affects the size of the ensuing tsunami as it has been widely modeled.

In October 2022 it was announced that a previously undetected magma chamber had been discovered approximately 2 to 4 km below sea level in the Kolumbo underwater volcano. Scientists had determined that it is gradually filling with melt. Although an eruption is not imminent, it does pose a threat which has prompted them to recommend real-time monitoring of the volcano.

See also
Minoan eruption
Timeline of volcanism on Earth

Notes

References

NOAA Ocean Explorer: Thera 2006 Expedition Summary
NOAA Ocean Explorer: Thera 2006 Expedition detailed Log
University of Rhode Island: Kolumbo Volcano
Ferdinand André Fouqué, Santorin et ses éruptions (Paris: Masson) 1879.
Haraldur Sigurdsson, S. Carey, C. Mandeville, 1990. "Assessment of mass, dynamics and environmental effects of the Minoan eruption of the Santorini volcano" in Thera and the Aegean World III: Proceedings of the Third Thera Conference, vol II, pp 100–12.
Haraldur Sigurdsson and S. Carey "Marine investigations of Greece's Santorini volcanic field"  (on-line text) Sigurdsson and Carey's revised estimate.

Further reading

Kilias, S.P., Nomikou, P., Papanikolaou, D., Polymenakou, P.N., Godelitsas, A., Argyraki, A., Carey, S., Gamaletsos, P., Mertzimekis, T.J., Stathopoulou, E., Goettlicher, J., Steininger, R., Betzelou, K., Livanos, I., Christakis, Ch., Croff Bell, K., Scoullos, M. (2013). New insights into hydrothermal vent processes in the unique shallow-submarine arc-volcano, Kolumbo (Santorini), Greece. Scientific Reports 3. doi:10.1038/srep02421

Vougioukalakis, G., A. Sbrana and D. Mitropoulos, 1995. "The 1649-50 Kolumbo submarine volcano activity, Santorini, Greece," in F. Barberi, R. Casale, M. Fratta, (eds.) The European Laboratory Volcanoes: Workshop Proceeding (Luxembourg: EC European Science Commission) pp 189–92.

External links

Minoan geography
Calderas of Greece
Volcanoes of Greece
Volcanoes of the Aegean
Submarine calderas
Active volcanoes
VEI-4 volcanoes
17th-century volcanic events
Landforms of Thira (regional unit)
Landforms of the South Aegean
Ephemeral islands
Former islands from the last glacial maximum